Arceuthobium azoricum (Portuguese: espigos-de-cedro) is a species of dwarf mistletoe endemic to the Azores. The population is restricted to the Grupo Central (central group) of the archipelago on Faial, Pico, São Jorge and Terceira islands. It is a parasitic plant of the local Juniperus brevifolia.

References

azoricum
Endemic flora of the Azores